The Croatian Demochristian Party ( or  HDS) is a political party in Croatia with the goal that Croatia will become a state with Christian ideals.

It was formed in 2009 from three former Christian Democratic parties:

 Croatian Demochristians
 Croatian Christian Democratic Party
 Party of Croatian Renaissance

Presidents of these three parties - Ante Ledić, Petar Kaćunko and Goran Dodig - signed a treaty that allowed for the Croatian Christian Democratic Party to be founded on 21 February 2009 in Zagreb.

The founders of the party said that their goal is to change the ideals of Croatia so that Croats will not care solely about material goods, but also about spiritual and moral values. Also, Kaćunko said that party will care for general good not for interests of one man.

The president of the party is Goran Dodig, and there are two vice-presidents are Ante Ledić and Petar Kaćunko.

History

Croatian Christian Democratic Party

The Croatian Christian Democratic Party was created in 1990 and modelled after the Christian Democrat parties of Western Europe, although, due to specific circumstances of early 1990s Croatia, it had more right wing than centre-right rhetoric.

In the 1990 Croatian parliamentary election it joined bloc of moderate nationalists called Coalition of People's Accord. Like all parties of that bloc, it fared badly, but one year later it had ministerial post in the "National Unity" government of Franjo Gregurić.

In the 1992 Croatian parliamentary election, HKDS, running on its own ticket, failed to enter Croatian Parliament, while its leader Ivan Cesar finished seventh in presidential race. This fiasco led HKDS to unite with Croatian Democratic Party (HDS) into Croatian Christian Democratic Union. Dissident faction of HKDS continued to operate under the party's old name.

Party of Croatian Renaissance

Party of Croatian Renaissance was a regional political party in Split-Dalmatia County of Croatia that splintered from the Croatian Social Liberal Party and was named after the Croatian Spring.

Croatian Christian Democrats
Croatian Christian Democrats was a minor right-wing conservative political party that was founded in 2002.

Electoral history

Legislative

European Parliament

References

External links
Profile at HIDRA.hr 

2009 establishments in Croatia
Christian democratic parties in Europe
Conservative parties in Croatia
Political parties established in 2009